The Kilwa Sultanate was a sultanate, centered at Kilwa (an island off modern-day, Kilwa District in Lindi Region of Tanzania), whose authority, at its height, stretched over the entire length of the Swahili Coast. According to the legend, it was founded in the 10th century by Ali ibn al-Hassan Shirazi, a Persian prince of Shiraz. His family ruled the Sultanate until the year 1277. They were replaced by the Arab family of Abu Moaheb until 1505, when they were overthrown by a Portuguese invasion. By 1513, the sultanate was already fragmented into smaller states, many of which became protectorates of the Sultanate of Oman.

History

The history of Kilwa begins around 960–1000 AD. According to legend, Ali ibn al-Hassan Shirazi was one of seven sons of a ruler of Shiraz, Persia, his mother an Abyssinian slave. Upon his father's death, Ali was driven out of his inheritance by his brothers. Setting sail out of Hormuz, Ali ibn al-Hassan, his household and a small group of followers first made their way to Mogadishu, the main commercial city of the East African coast. However, Ali failed to get along with the city's Somali elite and he was soon driven out of that city as well.

Steering down the African coast, Ali is said to have purchased the island of Kilwa from the local Bantu inhabitants. According to one chronicle (Strong, 1895), Kilwa was originally owned by a mainland Bantu king 'Almuli' and connected by a small land bridge to the mainland that appeared in low tide.  The king agreed to sell it to Ali ibn al-Hassan for as much colored cloth as could cover the circumference of the island. But when the king later changed his mind, and tried to take it back, the Persians had dug up the land bridge, and Kilwa was now an island.

Rather than being a literal retelling of events, this legendary history serves to legitimize the dynasty through ties to Islam. According to Horton and Middleman, "the descent from a noble Islamic family and an Abyssinian (Ethiopian) slave 'explains' why the rulers were both black but also with royal Muslim descent; the giving of cloth to the ruler made him 'civilized' and so his daughter became marriageable."

Kilwa's fortuitous position made it a much better East African trade center than Mogadishu. It quickly began to attract many merchants and immigrants from further north, including Persia and Arabia. In just a few years, the city was big enough to establish a satellite settlement at nearby Mafia Island.

Kilwa's emergence as a commercial center challenged the dominance once held by Mogadishu over the East African coast. Suleiman Hassan, the ninth successor of Ali (and 12th ruler of Kilwa, c. 1178–1195), wrested control of the southerly city of Sofala from the Mogadishans. Wealthy Sofala was the principal entrepot for the gold and ivory trade with Great Zimbabwe and Monomatapa in the interior. The acquisition of Sofala brought a windfall of gold revenues to the Kilwa Sultans, which allowed them to finance their expansion and extend their powers all along the East African coast.

At the zenith of its power in the 15th century, the Kilwa Sultanate owned or claimed overlordship over the mainland cities of Malindi, Inhambane and Sofala and the island-states of Mombassa, Pemba, Zanzibar, Mafia, Comoro and  Mozambique (plus numerous smaller places) – essentially what is now often referred to as the "Swahili Coast".

Kilwa also claimed lordship across the channel over the myriad of small trading posts scattered on the coast of Madagascar (then known by its Arabic name of Island of the Moon). To the north, Kilwa's power was checked by the independent Somali city-states of Barawa (a self-ruling aristocratic republic) and Mogadishu (the once-dominant city, Kilwa's main rival). To the south, Kilwa's reach extended as far as Cape Correntes, below which merchant ships did not usually dare sail.

While a single figure, the Sultan of Kilwa, stood at the top of the hierarchy, the Kilwa Sultanate was not a centralized state. It was more a confederation of commercial cities, each with its own internal elite, merchant communities and trade connections. The Sultan might appoint a governor or overseer, but even his authority was not consistent – in some places (e.g. outposts like Mozambique Island) he was a true governor in the Sultan's name, whereas in more established cities like Sofala, his powers were much more limited, more akin to an ambassador to the city than its governor.

Society and economy
Despite its origin as a Persian colony, extensive inter-marriage and conversion of local Bantu inhabitants and later Arab immigration turned the Kilwa Sultanate into a veritable melting pot, ethnically indifferentiable from the mainland. The mixture of Perso-Arab and Bantu cultures is credited for creating a distinctive East African culture and language known today as Swahili (literally, 'coast-dwellers'). Nonetheless, the Muslims of Kilwa (whatever their ethnicity) would often refer to themselves generally as Shirazi or Arabs, and to the unconverted Bantu peoples of the mainland as Zanj or Khaffirs ('infidels').

The Kilwa Sultanate was almost wholly dependent on external commerce. Effectively, it was a confederation of urban settlements, and there was little or no agriculture carried on within the boundaries of the sultanate. Grains (principally millet and rice), meats (cattle, poultry) and other necessary supplies to feed the large city populations had to be purchased from the Bantu peoples of the interior. Kilwan traders from the coast encouraged the development of market towns in the Bantu-dominated highlands of what are now Kenya, Tanzania, Mozambique and Zimbabwe. The Kilwan mode of living was as middlemen traders, importing manufactured goods (cloth, etc.) from Arabia and India, which were then swapped in the highland market towns for Bantu-produced agricultural commodities (grain, meats) for their own subsistence and precious raw materials (gold, ivory, etc.) which they would export back to Asia.

The exception was the coconut palm tree. Grown all along the coast, the coconut palm was the mainstay of Kilwan life in every way – not only for the fruit, but also for timber, thatching and weaving. Kilwan merchant ships – from the large lateen-rigged dhows that plied the open oceans to the small zambucs used for local transit – were usually built from the split trunks of coconut palm wood, their sails made from coconut leaf matting and the ships held together by coconut coir.

The Kilwa Sultanate conducted extensive trade with Arabia, Persia, and across the Indian Ocean, to India itself. Coins from the Kilwa Sultanate have been found as far as the Wessel Islands in Australia which was inhabited by
the Yolngu at that time. Kilwan ships made use of the seasonal monsoon winds to sail across to India in the summer, and back to Africa in the winter. Kilwan pilots had a reputation for extraordinary sailing accuracy. The Portuguese marveled at their navigational instruments, particularly their latitude staves, which they considered superior to their own.

Nonetheless, the coir sewn Kilwan ships were not seaworthy enough to brave the treacherous waters and unpredictable violent gusts around Cape Correntes, so the entire region south of that point was rarely sailed by Kilwan merchants. Inhambane was the most southerly settlement that can be considered part of the Kilwan trading empire.

Decline and fall
In its later years, the Sultans of Kilwa began falling into the hands of their ambitious ministers (viziers and emirs), who played the roles of kingmakers, and de facto rulers, and occasionally tried to foist themselves (or one of their family members) on the throne, in competition with the royal dynasty. The most successful was probably Emir Muhammad Kiwabi, who ruled Kilwa for nearly two decades through several sultans, including himself at one point.

Throughout his long 'reign', Emir Muhammad fought an on-again and off-again battle with his nephew, Hassan ibn Suleiman (son of an earlier vizier). Muhammad had, in fact, tried to install Hassan as sultan a couple of times, but it met tremendous resistance from the population of Kilwa. Eventually, Emir Muhammad decided that, in the interests of constitutional propriety and civic peace, Kilwa sultans should always come from the royal dynasty, not families of viziers. Muhammad held that line more or less down to the end, thwarting Hassan's ambitions.

The last sultan installed by Emir Muhammad before his death was the royal prince al-Fudail ibn Suleiman in 1495. The man who succeeded to Muhammad's post, Emir Ibrahim (known as Mir Habrahemo in Barros, Abraemo in Goes), helped al-Fudail crush the ambitious Hassan once and for all in a great battle outside Kilwa. But it was not long after this battle that Emir Ibrahim is said to have betrayed and murdered sultan al-Fudail. Rather than declare himself sultan, Ibrahim took power merely with the title of emir, and claimed to be exercising rule in the name of a son of an earlier sultan Suleiman (ibn Muhammad?) of the old royal dynasty. That no one had seen or heard of this absent prince for years was quite convenient for Emir Ibrahim.

Emir Ibrahim's usurpation was met with shock not only in Kilwa, but in the vassal cities as well. Emir Muhammad had (belatedly) recognized the importance of constitutional propriety for peace in the Kilwa Sultanate. Emir Ibrahim's murderous coup had run roughshod over it. Most of the local governors of the Kilwa vassal cities, many who were either relatives or had owed their positions to Emir Muhammad and the royal dynasty, refused to acknowledge the usurpation of Emir Ibrahim, and began charting an independent course for their own city-states. The writ of Emir Ibrahim probably only covered the city of Kilwa itself and possibly Mozambique Island.

This was more or less the condition of the Kilwa Sultanate when the Portuguese arrived.

Portuguese scout Pêro da Covilhã, disguised as an Arab merchant, had travelled the length of the Kilwa Sultanate in 1489–90, and visited the ports of Malindi, Kilwa and Sofala, and delivered his scouting report back to Lisbon, describing the condition of the Kilwa Sultanate in quite some detail. The first Portuguese ships, under Vasco da Gama, on their way to India, reached the sultanate in 1497. Da Gama made contact with the Kilwa vassals of Mozambique, Mombassa and Malindi, seeking to secure their cooperation as staging posts for the Portuguese India Armadas.

In 1500, the 2nd Portuguese India Armada, under Pedro Álvares Cabral, visited Kilwa itself, and attempted to negotiate a commercial and alliance treaty with Emir Ibrahim. But emir prevaricated and no agreement was reached.

The well-armed Fourth Armada of 1502, under Vasco da Gama again, came in a more mean-spirited mood, indisposed to take no for an answer. Having secured separate treaties with Malindi, Mozambique and all-important Sofala, the Portuguese brought their menacing fleet to bear on Kilwa itself, and extorted a sizeable tribute from Emir Ibrahim.

Some have speculated whether Emir Ibrahim missed a golden opportunity to restore his fortunes, that had a treaty with Cabral been reached back in 1500, he might have secured the assistance of the Portuguese navy in bringing the half-independent vassals back under his sway. At least one Kilwan nobleman, a certain Muhammad ibn Rukn ad Din (known to the Portuguese as Muhammad Arcone), certainly advised Emir Ibrahim to strike up an alliance with the Portuguese (and for his pains, was given up as a hostage to the Portuguese by the Emir, who then refused ransom him back – allowing him to be subjected to da Gama's wrath).

As it turns out, the vassals used the Portuguese, one by one, to secure their permanent break from the Sultanate. The ruler of Malindi was the first to embrace the Portuguese, forging an alliance in 1497 (largely to be directed against Mombassa). After Emir Ibrahim's coup, it was certainly not hard to persuade the ruling sheikh Isuf of Sofala (Yçuf in Barros, Çufe in Goes; he was apparently a nephew of the late Emir Muhammad) to break away. He signed a treaty with the Portuguese in 1502, and followed it up by allowing the construction of a Portuguese factory and fort in Sofala in 1505.

It was in 1505 that Francisco de Almeida brought his fleet into the harbor of Kilwa, and landed some 500 Portuguese soldiers to drive Emir Ibrahim out of the city. Almeida installed the aforementioned Muhammad Arcone on the throne, as a Portuguese vassal. Remembering constitutional proprieties, Arcone insisted that Micante, the son of the late sultan al-Fudail be his designated successor. The Portuguese erected a fortress (Fort Santiago) on Kilwa and left a garrison behind, under the command of Pedro Ferreira Fogaça, to keep an eye on things.

Portuguese rule was not very welcome. Particularly grating was the imposition of Portuguese mercantilist laws on the sultanate, forbidding all but Portuguese ships to carry trade to the principal coastal towns – essentially putting many leading Kilwan merchants out of business.

The Portuguese did not stay very long.  In May, 1506, Muhammad Arcone was lured and assassinated by the sheikh of Tirendicunde (a relative of Emir Ibrahim). As per the pre-arranged succession rule, Micante ascended to the throne. But Fogaça, seeing that Micante's ascension was supported by the old faction of Emir Ibrahim, concluded he would not do as a Portuguese puppet. Consequently, he deposed Micante and installed Hussein ibn Muhammad, a son of Arcone, as the new sultan.

Chaos broke out in the city of Kilwa.  Partisans of Micante (and Emir Ibrahim) seized control of much of the city, driving sultan Hussein (and the partisans of Arcone) to seek refuge by the Portuguese Fort Santiago. Street fighting and soon fires broke out. In the chaos, streams of Kilwan residents fled the city, leaving it practically deserted, save for a handful of roving partisan gangs and the terrified Portuguese garrison.

Hearing of the Kilwan chaos all the way in India, the Portuguese viceroy Almeida dispatched a magistrate Nuno Vaz Pereira to inquire into the matter. Arriving in late 1506, Pereira convened the competing sultans Micante and Hussein, and asked them present their cases. Pereira ruled in favor of Hussein, confirming him as sultan, but softened the blow by relieving the unpopular commander Fogaça and lifting the mercantilist restrictions on Kilwa shipping.

The Kilwan refugees returned and a modicum of peace resumed, but only briefly. For Hussein put it in his head to lead the Kilwan army against Tirendicunde, to avenge his father's murder. The town was brutally sacked, and numerous prisoners taken. Hussein then dispatched emissaries to all the vassal cities of the Kilwa Sultanate, ordering them to return to obedience, or else meet the same fate.

Fearing that Hussein's spate of tyranny might jeopardize Portuguese interests in East Africa, viceroy Almeida reversed Pereira's decision, deposed Hussein and reinstated Micante.

Rulers
The chronology of rulers of the Kilwa Sultanate is reported in a chronicle translated into Portuguese in the 16th century, and recorded by the chronicler João de Barros. There is another surviving chronicle by an unknown author, written in the early 16th century, and compiled in 1862 by (or for) sheikh Moheddin (Majid?) of Zanzibar. The Barros and Zanzibar chronicles are not always in concordance with each other. The following follows Barros in its outlines, but fills in details from the Zanzibar chronicle. Alternative spellings and nicknames, mainly given in Barros's chronicle, are in italics. Dates are approximate years of ascension.

Shirazi era
 (957 CE) Ali ibn al-Hassan Shirazi (Ighawumij) – founder of Kilwa
 (?) Muhammad ibn Ali (Ali Bumale, son of previous) – ruled forty years.  Had no children.
 (996) Ali ibn Bashat (Ali Busoloquete, nephew or cousin of previous) – elected by Kilwa colonists. He was the son of Bashat ibn al-Hassan, the brother of sultan Ali ibn al-Hassan; Bashat had been appointed by his brother as the first ruler of Mafia Island.  Bashat's son Ali ruled Kilwa for four and a half years.
 (c. 1001) Dawud ibn Ali (son of previous) – deposed after four years by Matata Mandalima, king of the Changa/Xanga. Dawud fled to Mafia island, where he died.
 (c. 1005) Khalid ibn Bakr (Hale Bonebaquer; said to be nephew of Matata Mandalima), installed as ruler of Kilwa by the Changa. Ruled only two years, deposed in uprising by Persian colonists.
 (1005/07) al-Hassan ibn Suleiman ibn Ali (Hocen Soleiman, nephew of the late Dawud) – installed by Persian colonists after uprising against Changa puppet, ruled 16 years.
 (1023?) Ali ibn Dawud I (son of Dawud, nephew of al-Hassan), ruled 60 years.
 (1083?) Ali ibn Dawud II (grandson of Ali ibn Dawud) – ruled 6 years, a deranged tyrant, deposed by the people of Kilwa, and condemned to die in a well.
 (1106) al-Hassan ibn Dawud (Hacen ben Daut, brother of Ali ibn Dawud II) – elevated by the people of Kilwa to replace his despised brother. Ruled 24 years.
 (1129) Suleiman (patronym unclear, "of royal lineage") – deposed and beheaded by the people of Kilwa after only two years.
 (1131) Dawud ibn Suleiman (son of previous) made his original career and fortune in Sofala, before being recalled to Kilwa to replace his father. Ruled 40 years.
(1170) Suleiman ibn al-Hassan ibn Dawud (Soleiman Hacen, son of ninth sultan given above), one of the greatest of Kilwa sultans, credited for conquering much of the Swahili Coast, bringing Sofala, Pemba, Zanzibar and portions of the mainland under Kilwa's rule; responsible for erecting many buildings in Kilwa itself, including its stone fortress and palaces, transforming the city into a veritable metropolis.  Ruled 18 years.
 (1189) Dawud ibn Suleiman (son of previous), ruled 2 years.
 (1190) Talut ibn Suleiman (brother of previous) ruled 1 year
 (1191) Hussein ibn Suleiman (brother of previous) – ruled 25 years.  Died without heirs.
 (1215) Khalid ibn Suleiman (Hale Bonij brother of previous) – ruled 10 years
 (1225) ? ibn Suleiman (Bone Soleiman, nephew of previous, son of ?) – ruled 40 years
 (1263–1267) Ali ibn Dawud (uncertain connection) – ruled 14 years.

End of Persian Shirazi dynasty c. 1277, beginning of Mahdali dynasty of Yemeni Arab sayyids, or what the Zanzibar chronicle calls the "family of Abu al-Mawahib".

Mahdali era

End of Mahdali dynasty c. 1495, beginning of a series of usurpers and Portuguese puppets.

Portuguese era

Possible link to Australia
In 1944, nine coins were found on Marchinbar Island, the largest island in the Wessel Islands of the Northern Territory of Australia. While four coins were identified as Dutch duits dating from 1690 to the 1780s, five with Arabic inscriptions were identified as being from the Kilwa Sultanate. The coins are now held by the Powerhouse Museum, Sydney, Australia. In 2018 another coin, also thought to be from Kilwa, was found on a beach on Elcho Island, another of the Wessel Islands.

See also
Kilwa Kisiwani
Swahili people
Swahili culture
Sultan al-Hasan ibn Sulaiman
Shirazi (ethnic group)

Notes

Sources
 João de Barros (1552–59) Décadas da Ásia: Dos feitos, que os Portuguezes fizeram no descubrimento, e conquista, dos mares, e terras do Oriente., esp. Dec. I, Lib. 8, Cap. 6 (p. 225ff)
 Bosworth, C.E. (1996) The New Islamic Dynasties: a chronological and genealogical manual. New York: Columbia University Press.
Damião de Goes (1566–67) Crónica do Felicíssimo Rei D. Manuel
 Freeman-Grenville, G.S.P. (1962) The Medieval History of the Coast of Tanganyika, with special reference to recent archaeological discoveries London.
 Horton, M. and J. Middleton (2000) The Swahili: the social landscape of a mercantile society, Oxford: Blackwell
 Rossini, C.C. (1899) "Vasco da Gama, Pedralvarez Cabral e Giovanni da Nova, nella cronica di Kilwah" Atti del Terzo Congresso Geografico Italiano, tenuto in Firenze,  Società geografica italiana, Firenze: Ricci, vol. 2, p.491-500.
 Strong, S. Arthur (1895) "The History of Kilwa, edited from an Arabic MS", Journal of the Royal Asiatic Society, January (No volume number), pp. 385–431. online
 Theal, George McCall (1902) The Beginning of South African History. London: Unwin.

External links

 
Former sultanates
Precolonial Tanzania
States and territories established in the 10th century
10th-century establishments in the Kilwa Sultanate
Shirazi people
1505 disestablishments